Gargaphia is a genus of lace bugs in the family Tingidae. There are more than 70 described species in Gargaphia.

Species
These 79 species belong to the genus Gargaphia:

 Gargaphia acmonis Drake & Hambleton, 1945
 Gargaphia albescens Drake, 1917
 Gargaphia amorphae (Walsh, 1864)
 Gargaphia angulata Heidemann, 1899
 Gargaphia argillacea Monte, 1943
 Gargaphia arizonica Drake & Carvalho, 1944
 Gargaphia balli Drake & Carvalho, 1944
 Gargaphia bimaculata Parshley, 1920
 Gargaphia bolivariana
 Gargaphia boliviana Monte, 1947
 Gargaphia brunfelsiae Monte, 1938
 Gargaphia carinata Gibson
 Gargaphia comosa Monte, 1941
 Gargaphia concursa Drake, 1930
 Gargaphia condensa Gibson, 1919
 Gargaphia condesa Gibson
 Gargaphia costalimai Monte, 1938
 Gargaphia crotonae Drake & Hambleton, 1938
 Gargaphia deceptiva (Drake & Bruner, 1924)
 Gargaphia decoris Drake, 1931
 Gargaphia differatis Drake, 1935
 Gargaphia dissortis Drake, 1930
 Gargaphia fasciata Stål, 1873
 Gargaphia flexuosa (Stål, 1858)
 Gargaphia formosa (Stål, 1858)
 Gargaphia gentilis Van Duzee, 1923
 Gargaphia gracilenta Drake, 1928
 Gargaphia gracilentis Drake
 Gargaphia holoxantha Monte, 1942
 Gargaphia implicata Drake & Hambleton, 1940
 Gargaphia inca Monte, 1943
 Gargaphia insularis Van Duzee, 1923
 Gargaphia interrogationis Monte, 1941
 Gargaphia iridescens Champion, 1897
 Gargaphia iridiscens Champion
 Gargaphia jucunda Drake & Hambleton, 1942
 Gargaphia lanei Monte, 1940
 Gargaphia lasciva Gibson
 Gargaphia limata Drake & Poor
 Gargaphia lunulata (Mayr, 1865)
 Gargaphia magna Gibson
 Gargaphia manni Drake & Hurd, 1945
 Gargaphia mexicana Drake, 1922
 Gargaphia mirabilis Monte, 1938
 Gargaphia munda (Stål, 1858)
 Gargaphia neivai Drake & Poor, 1940
 Gargaphia nexilis Drake & Hambleton, 1940
 Gargaphia nigrinervis Stål, 1873
 Gargaphia nociva Drake & Hambleton, 1940
 Gargaphia obliqua Stål, 1873
 Gargaphia opacula Uhler, 1893
 Gargaphia opima Drake, 1931
 Gargaphia oreades Drake, 1928
 Gargaphia oregona Drake & Hurd, 1945
 Gargaphia panamensis Champion, 1897
 Gargaphia paraguayensis Drake & Poor, 1940
 Gargaphia patria (Drake & Hambleton, 1938)
 Gargaphia patricia (Stål, 1862)
 Gargaphia paula Drake, 1939
 Gargaphia penningtoni Drake, 1928
 Gargaphia sanchezi Froeschner, 1972
 Gargaphia schulzei Drake, 1954
 Gargaphia seorsa Drake & Hambleton, 1945
 Gargaphia serjaniae Drake & Hambleton, 1938
 Gargaphia shelfordi Drake & Hambleton, 1944
 Gargaphia socorrona Drake, 1954
 Gargaphia solani Heidemann, 1914 (eggplant lace bug)
 Gargaphia sororia Hussey, 1957
 Gargaphia stigma Monte, 1940
 Gargaphia subpilosa Berg, 1879
 Gargaphia tiliae (Walsh, 1864) (basswood lace bug)
 Gargaphia torresi Costa Lima, 1922
 Gargaphia trichoptera Stål, 1873
 Gargaphia tuthilli Drake & Carvalho, 1944
 Gargaphia valderioi Drake
 Gargaphia valerioi Drake, 1941
 Gargaphia vanduzeei Gibson, 1919
 Gargaphia vanduzzeei Gibson, 1917
 Gargaphia venosa Drake & Poor, 1942

References

Further reading

External links

 

Tingidae
Articles created by Qbugbot